The 2006 Hope-PBA All-Star Weekend was the annual all-star weekend of the Philippine Basketball Association (PBA)'s 2005–06 PBA season. This was the second all-star weekend held in the season, due to the league adjusting its season calendar.

All-Star Weekend
The winners in this edition of the All-Star Weekend are as follows: 
(A) Sophomores over the Rookies, 133–123, with Nelbert Omolon emerging as MVP. 
(B) Willie Miller in the Obstacle and Trick Shot Challenges. 
(C) William Antonio in the 3-point shootout. 
(D) Niño Canaleta in the Slam Dunk competition. 
(E) Tony dela Cruz in the shooting stars event.  
(F) The team of Jojo Lastimosa, Ricardo Marata and Boybits Victoria in the Legends Shootout.

Main All-Star Game

Rosters

North All-Stars:
Rommel Adducul (Barangay Ginebra) *Did not show up
John Arigo (Coca-Cola)
Nic Belasco (Alaska)
Mark Caguioa (Barangay Ginebra) *Did not show up
Jayjay Helterbrand (Barangay Ginebra)
Danny Ildefonso (San Miguel)
Willie Miller (Alaska)
Ali Peek (Coca-Cola)
Olsen Racela (San Miguel)
Kerby Raymundo (Purefoods)
Renren Ritualo (Air21)
Enrico Villanueva (Red Bull)
Coach: Binky Favis (Coca-Cola)

South All-Stars:
Jimmy Alapag (Talk 'N Text)
Cyrus Baguio (Red Bull)
Noy Castillo (Purefoods) *Did not show up
Dondon Hontiveros (San Miguel)
Reynel Hugnatan (Alaska)
Eric Menk (Barangay Ginebra)
Dorian Peña (San Miguel)
Rafi Reavis (Coca-Cola)
Danny Seigle (San Miguel)
Asi Taulava (Talk 'N Text)
James Yap (Purefoods)
Roger Yap (Purefoods)
Coach: Jong Uichico (San Miguel)

Game

References

All-Star Weekend
Philippine Basketball Association All-Star Weekend
PBA All-Star Weekend 2006